Science Robotics is a peer-reviewed scientific journal published by the American Association for the Advancement of Science. The editor-in-chief is Holden Thorp of AAAS. Subjects covered are Artificial intelligence, Mathematics, Computer science, Mechanical Engineering, macro, micro and nano robots, advanced materials, and biologically influenced designs. Its scope includes theoretical research and real world applications. The 2020 impact factor is 23.748.

Abstracting and indexing
Science Citation Index
Current Contents - Engineering, Computing & Technology
Scopus
MEDLINE
Index Medicus

References

American Association for the Advancement of Science academic journals
Robotics journals
English-language journals
Computer science journals
Publications established in 2016
Monthly journals